William Bedford was a footballer who played as an inside right with Doncaster Rovers from 1889 to 1885.

Career
Bedford played at inside right in the first match Doncaster Rovers played under that name, at Rawmarsh on 3 October 1879. In a time where records of most lineups and scorers are unavailable, his first recorded goal was on 21 January 1882 in a 5–0 home victory in a friendly game against Frodingham, and then he scored both goals in a 2–0 home win against Sheffield Clarence on 15 March 1884.

His last recorded appearance was in scoring in a 2–0 victory at Kilnhurst Church in a 2–0 win in front of a recorded crowd of 500.

During his time with Rovers, the team played 57 matches over 6 seasons, and he is recorded as having scored 4 goals.

He was elected as a committee member of the club for the 1882–83 season.

References

Year of birth unknown
Year of death unknown
English footballers
Association football forwards
Doncaster Rovers F.C. players